Simon Meredith may refer to:

 Simon Meredith (Emmerdale), a character on the ITV soap opera Emmerdale
 Simon Meredith (umpire) (born 1975), Australian rules football field umpire